The Wight Pusher Seaplane, or Navyplane, was a British twin-float patrol seaplane produced by John Samuel White & Company Limited (Wight Aircraft).

Design and development

Designed by Howard T Wright, the Pusher Seaplane was an enlarged version of the first successful product of the aircraft department of John Samuel White & Company Limited (Wight Aircraft), the Wight Seaplane No.2. The aircraft was an unequal-span pusher biplane with five-bay wings mounted on two long floats. It was powered by a single 200 hp (149 kW) Salmson Canton Unné water cooled radial engine. It was exhibited at the 1914 Olympia Air Show in March that year, and was first flown on 8 April. It exhibited good take-off, climb performance and endurance, with these properties giving rise to orders from both the British Royal Naval Air Service, who ordered three and the German Kaiserliche Marine, who also ordered three. The German aircraft were taken over by the British at the outbreak of the First World War.

Orders for a further seven Improved Navyplane Type A.I followed, these having a stronger airframe, folding wings and an 8 ft (2.4 m) greater wingspan, but retaining the Salmson engine. A further four aircraft were built powered by a 225 hp (168 kW) Sunbeam engine, known as the Improved Navyplane Type A.II.

Operational history
The Navyplanes were used for maritime reconnaissance missions over the North Sea, while four of the Improved Navyplanes were sent to the Dardanelles to serve in the Gallipoli Campaign. The four Sunbeam-powered aircraft proved unsuccessful owing to unreliability of the powerplant, and only saw limited use.

Operators

Royal Navy
Royal Naval Air Service

Specifications (Seaplane)

References

See also

1910s British military reconnaissance aircraft
Floatplanes
Single-engined pusher aircraft
Wight aircraft
Biplanes
Aircraft first flown in 1914